Stigmella arbatella is a moth of the family Nepticulidae. It is known from Morocco.

External links
Nepticulidae and Opostegidae of the world

Nepticulidae
Endemic fauna of Morocco
Moths described in 1922
Moths of Africa